Suphisellus simoni is a species of burrowing water beetle in the subfamily Noterinae. It was described by Régimbart in 1889 and is found in Argentina, Brazil, Colombia, Mexico, Panama, Paraguay and Venezuela.

References

Suphisellus
Beetles described in 1889